2017 Mogadishu bombing may refer to:

January 2017 Mogadishu bombings (disambiguation)
February 2017 Mogadishu bombing
14 October 2017 Mogadishu bombings
28 October 2017 Mogadishu bombings